Aeolopetra is a genus of moths of the family Crambidae. It was described by Edward Meyrick in 1934.

Species
Aeolopetra lanyuensis Yen, 1996
Aeolopetra palaeanthes Meyrick, 1934
Aeolopetra phoenicobapta (Hampson, 1898)

References

Musotiminae
Crambidae genera
Taxa named by Edward Meyrick